De retour à la source is francophone Canadian pop singer Isabelle Boulay's fifth studio album. The album was released in 2007 and is a return to the singer's country music roots.

The album was nominated as one of the five finalists for the 2008 Juno Awards for the category "Francophone Album of The Year"

Track listing
 "Entre Matane et Baton Rouge" 
 "Un monde à refaire"
 "Adrienne"
 "Simplement tout"
 "De retour à la source"
 "Lui"
 "Aller simple"
 "Comme un jour sans amour" 
 "Tant que l'amour existera" 
 "Only a Woman's Heart"
 "Si j'étais perdue"
 "Mon village du bout du monde"

Certifications

Charts

References

2007 albums
Isabelle Boulay albums